The Sharp PC-3000 was an MS-DOS-based palmtop computer introduced in 1991. The "SPC" was designed and developed by Distributed Information Processing Research Ltd. ("DIP") in the UK. DIP had earlier designed the Atari Portfolio and the two machines shared many design features both in hardware and software.

Features
As with desktop IBM PCs, this one-pound device's
 screen displayed 80-column 25 lines.

Peripherals
The machine was one of the first to support the PC card interface, at the time known as PCMCIA.

Printers, floppy drives, dial-up modems, Fax modems were among the supported peripheral devices.

System software
Choice were MS-DOS 3.3 and Microsoft Windows 3.0 (running in real mode with a mouse).

Application software
The machine came with a suite of built in application providing a simple word processor, calculator and 1-2-3 compatible spreadsheet.

With some tweaking, it was also possible to run WordPerfect, Windows Word and Windows Excel.

Sharp PC-3100
A 2 MB model was produced: the 3100.

Notes and references

Computer-related introductions in 1991
PC-3000